Essex County Hall is a municipal building in Market Road, Chelmsford, Essex: it is the headquarters of Essex County Council. Blocks C and D are Grade II listed buildings.

History

Following the implementation of the Local Government Act 1888, which established county councils in every county, it became necessary to find facilities for Essex County Council. Rather than using the shire hall for county council administration, as many other county councils did, county leaders established two small offices on the north side of King Edward's Street. Formal meetings of the full county council were held in London in the early 20th century, in order to minimise travel for county councillors working in the City of London, so there was no need for a meeting place in Essex.

In due course more substantial facilities became necessary and a red brick building on Duke Street known as Block D, designed by Frank Whitmore in the classical style, was completed in 1909. The design involved an asymmetrical main frontage with four bays facing Duke Street; the left bay featured an arched recess containing a doorway with a fanlight above flanked by Doric order columns and full height stone pilasters bearing the county coat of arms; there was a double window on the first floor and a triple window on the second floor with an open pediment above.

When further expansion was needed, the properties in King Edward's Street were demolished and the most imposing part of the new county hall complex, a building clad in Portland Stone on the corner of Duke Street and Threadneedle Street known as Block C, designed by J. Stuart, was built between 1929 and 1939. The design featured a main entrance at the south east corner of the building; there was a doorway on the ground floor flanked by Doric order columns supporting an entablature with a pediment above; there was a round headed window on the first floor flanked by Corinthian order columns and there were smaller windows on the floors above. A geometric pattern was carved into the stonework above the doorway; this subsequently led to controversy as the carving was capable of being interpreted as a line of swastikas. Internally, the principal rooms were the council chamber, the committee room and the council chairman's room which were all fitted out at the expense of the businessman and philanthropist, Sir William Courtauld.

A modern 3-storey building in the heart of the complex, known as Block B, followed after the Second World War and a modern 9-storey building on Victoria Road South, known as Block A, which was designed by H. Connolly, was built between 1959 and 1965.

Works of art in the building include a bust of the politician, Thomas Gardiner Bramston, by the sculptor, John Ternouth and a bust of the politician, John Perry-Watlington, by the sculptor, William Theed.

References

Essex County Council
Chelmsford
Grade II listed buildings in Essex
County halls in England
Government buildings completed in 1909